Pegāh Ahmadi (born 1974) is an Iranian poet, scholar, literary critic and translator of poetry.

Biography
Pegah Ahmadi was born in Tehran, in 1974. She began writing poetry at the age of seven. At seventeen she made her début as a poet by the publication of a poem in the literary magazine Takāpu, edited by Mansur Kushān. Since then she has regularly contributed to literary magazines inside Iran.  She has studied Persian Literature at the University of Tehran.

Ahmadi has published four books of poetry, On the Final Sol G (1999), Cadence (2001), Writing Footnotes on the Wall of the Family Home (200?), and My These Days Is Throat (2004). Her fifth book of poems, To Find Faults will be published in the course of this year (2008). She has further published two works of translation from English into Persian, one an anthology of the poems by Sylvia Plath, with the title The Love Song of the Insane Girl (2000), and the other, a translation of the book Haiku: Poetry Ancient and Modern, by Jackie Hardy, with the title Hundred and One Haikus, From Past to Present (2007). Ahmadi's scholarly book Women's Poetry from the Beginning to the Present Day was published by Nashr-e Sāles (Sāles Publications) in 2005. The first volume of Ahmadi's second scholarly book A Comprehensive Anthology of the Poetry by Iranian Women, will be published shortly by Cheshmeh Publications.

Ahmadi has published over sixty articles on subject matters related to criticism of verse, theoretical issues pertaining to poetry and translation of poems in such monthly and quarterly arts and literary magazines as Dourān, Kārnāmeh, Kelk, Jahān-e Ketāb, Bokhārā, Bidār, Sabk-e Nou, Film, Zanān, Thursday Evening, Āzarang, Nāfeh, Shoukarān, Āzmā, Negāh-e Nou, Payām-e Shomāl and Pāprik.

Selected works

Collections of poetry
 Ruy-e Sol-e Pāyān-i (روی سُل ِ پایانی), On the Final Sol G, 1999
 Kādens (کادِنس), Cadence, 2001
 Tahshiyeh bar Divār-e Khānegi (تحشیه بر دیوار ِ خانگی), Writing Footnotes on the Wall of the Family Home, 200?
 In Ruzhā'yam Galust (این روزهایم گلوست), My These Days Is Throat, 2004
 Āhu Khāni (آهوخوانی), To Find Faults, to be published in 2008

Scholarly books
 She'r-e Zan az Āghāz tā Emruz (شعر ِ زن از آغاز تا امروز), Women's Poetry from the Beginning to the Present Day, 2005

Translations from English
 Āvāz Āsheghāneh-ye Dochtar-e Divāneh (آواز ِ عاشقانه ی دختر ِ دیوانه), The Love Song of the Insane Girl, 2000
 Sad o Yek Haiku, Az Gozashteh tā Emruz (صد و یك هایكو، از گذشته تا امروز), Hundred and One Haikus, From Past to Present, 2007. A translation of [possibly] the book Haiku: Poetry Ancient and Modern, by Jakie Hardy (Tuttle Publishing).

Notes

Sources
 A curriculum vitae of Pegah Ahmadi on the official website of Khorshid: Iranian Women's Poetry Prize, in Persian, .
 A poem by Pegāh-e Ahmadi (She'e-ri az Pegāh-e Ahmadi), in Persian, Gābil.
 Pegah Ahmadi, Dichter (Poet), Poetry International Rotterdam, Stichting Poetry International (Poetry International Society), .

External links
 Farhad Akbarzadeh, an interview with Pegah Ahmadi, in Persian, Aruz Literary Publication (Nashriyeh-ye Adabi-e Aruz), June 24, 2008, .
 Pouyā Azizi, an interview with Pegah Ahmadi, in Persian, Māh'mag World Literature, .
 Soheil Ghafelzadeh, A commentary on "My These Days Is Throat" - Pegah Ahmadi, in Persian, Emzā, No. 2, .
 Mojtaba Pourmohsen, a radio interview with Pegah Ahmadi and Mehrdad Fallah on the occasion of the 8th anniversary of the death of Ahmad Shamlou, in Persian, Radio Zamaneh, July 24, 2008, . Audio recording of the interview: .

1974 births
Living people
21st-century Iranian poets
Persian-language poets
Writers from Tehran
Iranian women writers
Persian-language women poets
20th-century Iranian poets